The regional Government of Extremadura is the group  of institutions ruling the Spanish autonomous community of Extremadura.

Structure 

It is headed by the President of Extremadura. Its legislative branch is the unicameral Assembly of Extremadura. Executive functions are performed by seven ministries (Consejerías).

The Board of Extremadura comprises the President, Vice President or Vice Presidents (if any) and regional ministers. Each minister is in charge of one Ministry and is freely appointed and dismissed by the President, reporting to the As

Function 

In accordance with the President's general guidelines, the government establishes policy and directs the administration of the Autonomous Region, exercising its executive and regulatory powers under the Spanish Constitution and the Statute of Extremadura. Its headquarters are in Mérida, capital of Extremadura, in accordance  with Article 5 of the Statute of Autonomy.

History 

The current President of the Government of Extremadura, Guillermo Fernández Vara, was elected in the elections of 2015. . The current government of Extremadura is composed of the following directors:

References

 
1999 establishments in Spain